Brooke DeBerdine (born May 19, 1999) is a field hockey player from the United States, who plays as a midfielder.

Personal life
Brooke DeBerdine was born and raised in Millersville, Pennsylvania.

She studied her major in Supply Chain Management at the University of Maryland.

Career

Domestic leagues
In 2022, DeBerdine travelled to Australia to play for the Tassie Tigers in the Sultana Bran Hockey One League.

National teams

Under–21
Brooke DeBerdine made her debut for the United States U–21 team in 2016 at the FIH Junior World Cup in Santiago.

She represented the team again in 2019 during a test series against Germany, held in Mönchengladbach and Viersen.

National team
DeBerdine made her debut for the national team in 2021, during a test series against Canada in Chula Vista.

She has since gone on to appear in season three of the FIH Pro League.

References

External links

1999 births
Living people
American female field hockey players
Female field hockey midfielders